The Râșcuța is a right tributary of the river Râșca in Romania. It flows into the Râșca near Dumbrăveni.

References

Rivers of Romania
Rivers of Suceava County